Nidaan is a 2000 Indian family drama film directed by Mahesh Manjrekar and produced by R. V. Pandit. Sanjay Dutt, Shivaji Satam, Reema Lagoo, Nisha Bains and Sunil Barve appeared in the main roles. The plot involved the ordeal of an AIDS-infected patient in getting her disease treated on the backdrop of India's "sub-standard medical facilities".

Cast 
 Shivaji Satam as Anirudh Nadkarni 
 Reema Lagoo as Suhasini A. 'Suhas' Nadkarni 
 Nisha Bains as Soumya A. Nadkarni 
 Sunil Barve as Ninad S. Kamat  
 Sanjay Dutt as himself
 Mohan Joshi as Dr. Dhawan 
 Shagufta Ali as Aditi Dhawan
 Sunil Shende as Dr. S.D. Potnis
 Shama Deshpande as Veena S. Kamat 
 Dilip Prabhavalkar as Shrikant Kamat

Songs

Release
The film was released on 27 July 2000. It was also dubbed and released in Tamil as Uyirin Uyire.

References

External links
 

2000 films
2000s Hindi-language films
Indian drama films
Films directed by Mahesh Manjrekar
HIV/AIDS in Indian films
2000 drama films
Hindi-language drama films